Loongana is a remote siding on the Trans-Australian Railway in the Australian state of Western Australia.

The area was formerly the site of a lime mine and processing plant. The settlement was dependent on the Tea and Sugar Train for the delivery of supplies until 1996 when the train was withdrawn.

As of 2022 the Indian Pacific, the only passenger train that traverses the entire Trans-Australian Railway, still passes there, but does not stop.

See also
 Localities on the Trans-Australian Railway

References

Disused railway stations in Western Australia
Nullarbor Plain
Trans-Australian Railway